Colombia–Philippines relations refers to bilateral foreign relations between Colombia and the Philippines. Colombia has an embassy in Manila. The Philippines is accredited to Colombia from its embassy in Brasília, Brazil and maintains an honorary consulate in Bogotá.

History 
Relations between Colombia and the Philippines began before they became nations. For a time after the establishment of the Manila Galleons that linked Latin America with Asia, Spain prohibited direct trade between the Viceroyalty of Peru, which included Colombia, and the Viceroyalty of New Spain, which included the Philippines. However, illegal trade between Filipinos and Colombians continued in secret, as illegal Asian goods ended up in the markets of Córdoba, Colombia, due to the collusion between Filipino, Peruvian, and Colombian merchants. They settled and traded with each other while contravening royal mercantile laws. Before the establishment of the First Filipino Republic, Colombians were seminal in the formation of the Philippines. Latin American officers from Gran Colombia were among the rebel soldiers supporting Andres Novales, the brief Emperor of the Philippines, in his short-lived revolt against Spain. Also, the first winner of the Miss International female beauty pageant, Miss Stella Marquez of Colombia, married Filipino Jorge Araneta (one of whose ancestors was Baltazar de Araneta of Mexico). Official relations between Colombia and the Philippines were established in 1959. Bilateral relations between the two nations remain healthy.

References

Philippines
Bilateral relations of the Philippines